Etruscan art was produced by the Etruscan civilization in central Italy between the 10th and 1st centuries BC. From around 750 BC it was heavily influenced by Greek art, which was imported by the Etruscans, but always retained distinct characteristics. Particularly strong in this tradition were figurative sculpture in terracotta (especially life-size on sarcophagi or temples), wall-painting and metalworking especially in bronze. Jewellery and engraved gems of high quality were produced.

Etruscan sculpture in cast bronze was famous and widely exported, but relatively few large examples have survived (the material was too valuable, and recycled later).  In contrast to terracotta and bronze, there was relatively little Etruscan sculpture in stone, despite the Etruscans controlling fine sources of marble, including Carrara marble, which seems not to have been exploited until the Romans.

The great majority of survivals came from tombs, which were typically crammed with sarcophagi and grave goods, and terracotta fragments of architectural sculpture, mostly around temples. Tombs have produced all the fresco wall-paintings, which show scenes of feasting and some narrative mythological subjects.

Bucchero wares in black were the early and native styles of fine Etruscan pottery. There was also a tradition of elaborate Etruscan vase painting, which sprang from its Greek equivalent; the Etruscans were the main export market for Greek vases. Etruscan temples were heavily decorated with colourfully painted terracotta antefixes and other fittings, which survive in large numbers where the wooden superstructure has vanished. Etruscan art was strongly connected to religion; the afterlife was of major importance in Etruscan art.

History

The Etruscans emerged from the Villanovan culture. Due to the proximity and/or commercial contact to Etruria, other ancient cultures influenced Etruscan art during the Orientalizing period, such as Greece, Phoenicia, Egypt, Assyria and the Middle East.  The Romans would later come to absorb the Etruscan culture into theirs but would also be greatly influenced by them and their art.

Periods
Etruscan art is usually divided into a number of periods:

900 to 700 BC – Villanovan period. Already the emphasis on funerary art is evident. Impasto pottery with geometric decoration, or shaped as hut urns.  Bronze objects, mostly small except for vessels, were decorated by moulding or by incised lines. Small statuettes were mostly handles or other fittings for vessels.
700–575 BC – Orientalising period. Foreign trade with established Mediterranean civilisations interested in the metal ores of Etruria and other products from further north led to imports of foreign art, especially that of Ancient Greece, and some Greek artists immigrated. Decoration adopted a Greek, and Near Eastern vocabulary with palmettes and other motifs, and the foreign lion was a popular animal to depict. The Etruscan upper class grew wealthy and began to fill their large tombs with grave goods. A native Bucchero pottery, now using the potter's wheel, went alongside the start of a Greek-influenced tradition of painted vases, which until 600 drew more from Corinth than Athens. The facial features (the profile, almond-shaped eyes, large nose) in the frescoes and sculptures, and the depiction of reddish-brown men and light-skinned women, influenced by archaic Greek art, follow the artistic traditions from the Eastern Mediterranean. These images have, therefore, a very limited value for a realistic representation of the Etruscan population. It was only from the end of the 4th century B.C. that evidence of physiognomic portraits began to be found in Etruscan art and Etruscan portraiture became more realistic.
575–480 BC – Archaic period. Prosperity continued to grow, and Greek influence grew to the exclusion of other Mediterranean cultures, despite the two cultures coming into conflict as their respective zones of expansion met each other. The period saw the emergence of the Etruscan temple, with its elaborate and brightly painted terracotta decorations, and other larger buildings. Figurative art, including human figures and narrative scenes, grew more prominent. The Etruscans adopted stories from Greek mythology enthusiastically. Paintings in fresco begin to be found in tombs (which the Greeks had stopped making centuries before), and were perhaps made for some other buildings. The Persian conquest of Ionia in 546 saw a significant influx of Greek artist refugees, especially in Southern Etruria. Other earlier developments continued, and the period produced much of the finest and most distinctive Etruscan art.
480–300 BC – Classical period. The Etruscans had now peaked in economic and political terms, and the volume of art produced reduced somewhat in the 5th century BC, with prosperity shifting from the coastal cities to the interior, especially the Po valley.  In the 4th century BC volumes revived somewhat, and previous trends continued to develop without major innovations in the repertoire, except for the arrival of red-figure vase painting, and more sculpture such as sarcophagi in stone rather than terracotta. Bronzes from Vulci were exported widely within Etruria and beyond. The Romans were now picking off the Etruscan cities one by one, with Veii being conquered around 396 BC.
300–50 BC – Hellenistic or late phase. Over this period the remaining Etruscan cities were all gradually absorbed into Roman culture, and, especially around the 1st century BC, the extent to which art and architecture should be described as Etruscan or Roman is often difficult to judge. Distinctive Etruscan types of object gradually ceased to be made, with the last painted vases appearing early in the period, and large painted tombs ending in the 2nd century. Styles continued to follow broad Greek trends, with increasing sophistication and classical realism often accompanied by a loss of energy and character. Bronze statues, now increasingly large, were sometimes replicas of Greek models. The large Greek temple pedimental sculpture groups of sculptures were introduced, but in terracotta.

Sculpture

The Etruscans were very accomplished sculptors, with many surviving examples in terracotta, both small-scale and monumental, bronze, and alabaster. However, there is very little in stone, in contrast to the Greeks and Romans. Terracotta sculptures from temples have nearly all had to be reconstructed from a mass of fragments, but sculptures from tombs, including the distinctive form of sarcophagus tops with near life-size reclining figures, have usually survived in good condition, although the painting on them has usually suffered.  Small bronze pieces, often including sculptural decoration, became an important industry in later periods, exported to the Romans and others. See the "Metalwork" section below for these, and "Funerary art" for tomb art.

The famous bronze "Capitoline Wolf" in the Capitoline Museum, Rome, was long regarded as Etruscan, its age is now disputed, it may actually date from the 12th century.

The Etruscan Head, 600 BC, Archaeological Museum in Milan.
The Centaur of Vulci, 590–580 BC, National Etruscan Museum at Villa Giulia, in Rome 
the painted terracotta Apollo of Veii, 510–500 BC, from the temple at Portanaccio attributed to Vulca at the National Etruscan Museum in Rome
the painted terracotta Sarcophagus of the Spouses, late 6th century BC, from Cerveteri at the National Etruscan Museum; there is a similar one in the Louvre
the bronze Chimera of Arezzo, dated 400 BC, at the National Archaeological Museum in Florence
The Mars of Todi, a bronze sculpture from 400 BC in the Museo Etrusco Gregoriano of the Vatican 
The Sarcophagus of Seianti Hanunia Tlesnasa, 150–140 BC, a masterpiece of Etruscan art in terracotta, now at the British Museum
The Orator, or Aule Metele ("L'Arringatore" in Italian), bronze found in Umbria now at the National Archaeological Museum in Florence

The Apollo of Veii is a good example of the mastery with which Etruscan artists produced these large art pieces. It was made, along with others, to adorn the temple at Portanaccio’s roof line. Although its style is reminiscent of the Greek Kroisos Kouros, having statues on the top of the roof was an original Etruscan idea.

Wall-painting

The Etruscan paintings that have survived are almost all wall frescoes from tombs, mainly located in Tarquinia, and dating from roughly 670 BC to 200 BC, with the peak of production between about 520 and 440 BC.  The Greeks very rarely painted their tombs in the equivalent period, with rare exceptions such as the Tomb of the Diver in Paestum and southern Italy, and the Macedonian royal tombs at Vergina.  The whole tradition of Greek painting on walls and panels, arguably the form of art that Greek contemporaries considered their greatest, is almost entirely lost, giving the Etruscan tradition, which undoubtedly drew much from Greek examples, an added importance, even if it does not approach the quality and sophistication of the best Greek masters.  It is clear from literary sources that temples, houses and other buildings also had wall-paintings, but these have all been lost, like their Greek equivalents.

The Etruscan tombs, which housed the remains of whole lineages, were apparently sites for recurrent family rituals, and the subjects of paintings probably have a more religious character than might at first appear. A few detachable painted terracotta panels have been found in tombs, up to about a metre tall, and fragments in city centres.

The frescoes are created by applying paint on top of fresh plaster, so that when the plaster dries the painting becomes part of the plaster, and consequently an integral part of the wall. Colours were created from ground up minerals of different colours and were then mixed to the paint. Fine brushes were made of animal hair.

From the mid 4th century BC chiaroscuro modelling began to be used to portray depth and volume. Sometimes scenes of everyday life are portrayed, but more often traditional mythological scenes, usually recognisable from Greek mythology, which the Etruscans seem largely to have adopted. Symposium scenes are common, and sport and hunting scenes are found.  The depiction of human anatomy never approaches Greek levels. The concept of proportion does not appear in any surviving frescoes and we frequently find portrayals of animals or men out of proportion. Various types of ornament cover much of the surface between figurative scenes.

Vase painting

Etruscan vase painting was produced from the 7th through the 4th centuries BC, and is a major element in Etruscan art. It was strongly influenced by Greek vase painting, followed the main trends in style, especially those of Athens, over the period, but lagging behind by some decades. The Etruscans used the same techniques, and largely the same shapes. Both the black-figure vase painting and the later red-figure vase painting techniques were used.  The subjects were also very often drawn from Greek mythology in later periods.

Besides being producers in their own right, the Etruscans were the main export market for Greek pottery outside Greece, and some Greek painters probably moved to Etruria, where richly decorated vases were a standard element of grave inventories.  It has been suggested that many or most elaborately painted vases were specifically bought to be used in burials, as a substitute, cheaper and less likely to attract robbers, for the vessels in silver and bronze that the elite would have used in life.

Bucchero ware
More fully characteristic of Etruscan ceramic art are the burnished, unglazed bucchero terracotta wares, rendered black in a reducing kiln deprived of oxygen. This was an Etruscan development based on the pottery techniques of the Villanovan period.  Often decorated with white lines, these may have eventually represented a traditional "heritage" style kept in use specially for tomb wares.

Terracotta panels
A few large terracotta pinakes or plaques, much larger than are typical in Greek art, have been found in tombs, some forming a series that creates in effect a portable wall-painting.  The "Boccanera" tomb at the Banditaccia necropolis at Cerveteri contained five panels almost a metre high set round the wall, which are now in the British Museum.  Three of them form a single scene, apparently the Judgement of Paris, while the other two flanked the inside of the entrance, with sphinxes acting as tomb guardians. They date to about 560 BC. Fragments of similar panels have been found in city centre sites, presumably from temples, elite houses and other buildings, where the subjects include scenes of everyday life.

Metalwork
The Etruscans were masters of bronze-working as shown by the many outstanding examples in museums, and from accounts of the statues sent to Rome after their conquest. According to Pliny, the Romans looted 2,000 bronze statues from the city of Volsinii alone after capturing it.

The Monteleone chariot is one of the finest examples of large bronzework and is the best-preserved and most complete of the surviving works.

The Etruscans had a strong tradition of working in bronze from very early times, and their small bronzes were widely exported. Apart from cast bronze, the Etruscans were also skilled at the engraving of cast pieces with complex linear images, whose lines were filled with a white material to highlight them; in modern museum conditions with this filling lost, and the surface inevitably somewhat degraded, they are often much less striking and harder to read than would have been the case originally. This technique was mostly applied to the roundish backs of polished bronze mirrors and to the sides of cistae.  A major centre for cista manufacture was Praeneste, which somewhat like early Rome was an Italic-speaking town in the Etruscan cultural sphere.  Some mirrors, or mirror covers (used to protect the mirror's reflective surface) are in a low relief.

Funerary art

The Etruscans excelled in portraying humans. Throughout their history they used two sets of burial practices: cremation and inhumation. Cinerary urns (for cremation) and sarcophagi (for inhumation) have been found together in the same tomb showing that throughout generations, both forms were used at the same time.
In the 7th century they started depicting human heads on canopic urns and when they started burying their dead in the late 6th century they did so in terracotta sarcophagi. These sarcophagi were decorated with an image of the deceased reclining on the lid alone or sometimes with a spouse.  The Etruscans invented the custom of placing figures on the lid which later influenced the Romans to do the same.  Funerary urns that were like miniature versions of the sarcophagi, with a reclining figure on the lid, became widely popular in Etruria.

The Hellenistic period funerary urns were generally made in two pieces. The top lid usually depicted a banqueting man or woman (but not always) and the container part was either decorated in relief in the front only or, on more elaborate stone pieces, carved on its sides. During this period, the terracotta urns were being mass-produced using clay in Northern Etruria (specifically in and around Chiusi). Often the scenes decorated in relief on the front of the urn were depicting generic Greek influenced scenes. The production of these urns did not require skilled artists and so what we are left with is often mediocre, unprofessional art, made en masse. However the colour choices on the urns offer evidence as to dating, as colours used changed over time.

Art and religion

Etruscan art was often religious in character and, hence, strongly connected to the requirements of Etruscan religion.  The Etruscan afterlife was negative, in contrast to the positive view in ancient Egypt where it was but a continuation of earthly life, or the confident relations with the gods as in ancient Greece.  Roman interest in Etruscan religion centred on their methods of divination and propitiating and discovering the will of the gods, rather than the gods themselves, which may have distorted the information that has come down to us. Most remains of Etruscan funerary art have been found in excavations of cemeteries (as at Cerveteri, Tarquinia, Populonia, Orvieto, Vetulonia, Norchia), meaning that what we see of Etruscan art is primarily dominated by depictions of religion and in particular the funerary cult, whether or not that is a true reflection of Etruscan art as a whole.

Museums
Etruscan tombs were heavily looted from early on, initially for precious metals.  From the Renaissance onwards Etruscan objects, especially painted vases and sarcophagi, were keenly collected. Many were exported before this was forbidden, and most major museum collections of classical art around the world have good selections. But the major collections remain in Italian museums in Rome, Florence, and other cities in areas that were formerly Etruscan, which include the results of modern archaeology.

Major collections in Italy include the National Etruscan Museum in the Villa Giulia in Rome, National Archaeological Museum in Florence, Vatican Museums, Tarquinia National Museum, and the Archeological Civic Museum in Bologna, as well as more local collections near important sites such as Cerveteri, Orvieto and Perugia. Some painted tombs, now emptied of their contents, can be viewed at necropoli such as Cerveteri.

From September 2021 to June 2022, a major exhibition of Etruscan art is on show at the MARQ Archaeological Museum of Alicante, Spain. The exhibition, Etruscans: The Dawn of Rome, features a large number of items on loan from the National Archaeological Museum, Florence and the Guarnacci Etruscan Museum in Volterra.

Gallery

See also 
 Etruscan architecture
 Isis Tomb, Vulci
 Ombra della sera
 Tomb of the Augurs
 Tomb of the Bulls
 Tomb of the Dancers
 Tomb of the Leopards
 Tomb of the Triclinium

Notes

References

Boardman, John ed., The Oxford History of Classical Art, 1993, OUP, 
"Grove", Cristofani, Mauri, et al. "Etruscan.", Grove Art Online, Oxford Art Online. Oxford University Press. Web. 28 Apr. 2016. Subscription required

Steingräber, Stephan, Abundance of Life: Etruscan Wall Painting, 2006, J. Paul Getty Museum, Getty Publications, google books

Williams, Dyfri. Masterpieces of Classical Art, 2009, British Museum Press,

Further reading

Bonfante, Larissa. “Daily Life and Afterlife.” In Etruscan Life and Afterlife. Detroit: Wayne State University Press, 1986.
——. "The Etruscans: Mediators between Northern Barbarians and Classical Civilization." In The Barbarians of Ancient Europe: Realities and Interactions. Edited by Larissa Bonfante, 233–281. Cambridge, UK: Cambridge Univ. Press, 2011.
Borrelli, Federica, and Maria Cristina Targia. The Etruscans: Art, Architecture, and History. Translated by Thomas M. Hartmann. Los Angeles: J. Paul Getty Museum, 2004.
Brendel, Otto. Etruscan Art. 2nd edition. New Haven: Yale University Press, 1995.
Briguet, M.-F. Etruscan Art: Tarquinia Frescoes. New York: Tudor, 1961.
Brilliant, Richard. Visual Narratives: Storytelling In Etruscan and Roman Art. Ithaca: Cornell University Press, 1984.
De Puma, Richard Daniel. Etruscan Art In the Metropolitan Museum of Art. New York: Metropolitan Museum of Art, 2013.
Steingräber, Stephan. Abundance of Life: Etruscan Wall Painting. Los Angeles: J. Paul Getty Museum, 2006.

External links

Etruscan Art, Laurel Taylor, Smarthistory
Etruscan pottery from the Albegna Valley/Ager Cosanus survey in Internet Archaeology

 
Art by period of creation
Etruscans